Jerry M. Fanning (born November 23, 1932, in Colorado Springs, Colorado) is a trainer of Thoroughbred racehorses. He grew up in Texas and began his career in horse racing as a groom for his father, trainer Lev Fanning. In 1958, he took out a trainer's license but waited until 1967 before becoming a full-time trainer.

Fanning's best horse was considered to be Desert Wine which won a number of important stake races and had solid second-place performances in the 1983 Kentucky Derby and Preakness Stakes. In 1984 Desert Wine won the Hollywood Gold Cup in which he beat John Henry.

References

1932 births
Living people
American horse trainers
Sportspeople from Colorado Springs, Colorado